The 2022 Swiss Women's Curling Championship, the national women's curling championship for Switzerland is being held from February 19 to February 26 in Thônex at the Trois-Chêne curling club. Team Tirinzoni are the defending champions and are returning from a fourth-place finish at the 2022 Olympics. There are seven teams competing to represent Switzerland at the 2022 World Women's Curling Championship.

The event, due to team Tirinzoni's participation at the olympics, was a six-team single round-robin tournament with three teams qualifying for the playoffs and team Tirizoni as the fourth team in the playoffs. The playoffs teams qualified for a single round-robin tournament for seeding purposed for the playoffs. The playoffs consist of best-of-one semi finals, a best-of-one third place game, and a best-of-three championship round. Teams Tirinzoni defeated team Keiser in 2–1 in a best of three final.

Teams
These are the teams participating in the event:

Round-robin standings
Round-robin standings at end of round:

{| 
|valign=top width=10%|

Round-robin results
All draw times are listed in Central European Time (UTC+01:00).

Draw 1
Sunday, February 20, 8:00 am

Draw 2
Sunday, February 20, 4:15 pm

Draw 3
Monday, February 21, 9:00 am

Draw 4
Monday, February 21, 7:00 pm

Draw 5
Tuesday, February 22, 2:00 pm

Seeding round robin standings
Round-robin standings at end of round:
{| 
|valign=top width=10%|

Seeding round robin results
All draw times are listed in Central European Time (UTC+01:00).

Draw 6
Wednesday, February 23, 8:00 pm

Draw 7
Thursday, February 24, 1:00 pm

Draw 8
Thursday, February 24, 7:00 pm

References

Curling competitions in Switzerland
Swiss Women's Curling Championship
Swiss Women's Curling Championship
Swiss Women's Curling Championship
2022 in Swiss women's sport
Sports competitions in Geneva